Articles related specifically to biomedical engineering include:

A
Artificial heart —
Artificial heart valve —
Artificial intelligence —
Artificial limb —
Artificial pacemaker —
Automated external defibrillator —

B
Bachelor of Science in Biomedical Engineering—
Bedsores—
Biochemistry —
Biochemistry topics list —
Bioelectrochemistry—
Bioelectronics—
Bioimpedance —
Bio-implants —
Bioinformatics —
Biology —
Biology topics list —
Biomechanics —
Biomedical engineering —
Biomedical imaging —
Biomedical Imaging Resource —
Bionics —
Biotechnology —
Biotelemetry —
Biothermia —
BMES —
Brain–computer interface —
Brain implant

C
Cell engineering —
Chemistry —
Chemistry topics list —
Clinical engineering —
Cochlear implant —
Corrective lens —
Crutch —

D
Dental implant —
Dialysis machines —
Diaphragmatic pacemaker —

E
Engineering —

F
Functional electrical stimulation

G
Genetic engineering —
Genetic engineering topics —
Genetics —

H
Health care —
Heart-lung machine —
Heart rate monitor —

I
Implant —
Implantable cardioverter-defibrillator —
Infusion pump —
Instrumentation for medical devices —

J

K

L
Laser applications in medicine —

M
Magnetic resonance imaging —
Maxillo-facial prosthetics —
Medical equipment —
Medical imaging —
Medical research —
Medication —
Medicine —
Microfluidics —
Molecular biology —
Molecular biology topics —

N
Nanoengineering —
Nano-scaffold —
Nanotechnology —
Neural engineering —
Neurally controlled animat —
Neuroengineering —
Neuroprosthetics —
Neurostimulator —
Neurotechnology —

O
Ocular prosthetics —
Optical imaging —
Optical spectroscopy —
Orthosis —

P
Pharmacology —
Physiological system modelling —
Positron emission tomography —
Prosthesis —
Polysomnograph —

Q

R
Radiological imaging —
Radiation therapy —
Reliability engineering —
Remote physiological monitoring —
Replacement joint —
Retinal implant —

S
Safety engineering —
Stem cell —

T
Tissue engineering —
Tissue viability —

U

V

W

X
X-ray —

Z

Biomedical engineering
Biomedical engineering topics